G30 may refer to:
Group of Thirty, an international body addressing economic issues.
BMW 5 Series (G30), the seventh generation of BMW 5 Series.
Glock 30 pistol.
G30 Schools.
Schizophrenia-associated gene DAOA-AS1, formerly known as G30.
G30 Lianyungang–Khorgas Expressway, an expressway in China.